Cantavieja is a municipality located in the province of Teruel, Aragon, Spain. According to the 2004 census (INE), the municipality had a population of 740 inhabitants. It is the capital of the Maestrazgo comarca.

Demography

Photo gallery
Cantavieja pictures

References

External links
Cantavieja on Diputación de Teruel
Cantavieja on Museo Virtual Maestrazgo

Municipalities in the Province of Teruel
Maestrazgo